The Portuguese Women's Handball Cup (Portuguese: Taça de Portugal de Andebol Feminino) is a Portuguese handball  competition, played in the Swiss system and eligible for all women's professional or amateur teams.

Winners

1975–76 : CF Belenenses
1976–77 : Lic.Maria Amália
1977–78 : Lic.Maria Amália (2)
1978–79 : Almada AC
1979–80 : Lic.Maria Amália (3)
1980–81 : CD Torres Novas
1981–82 : C.Ourique
1982–83 : C.Ourique (2)
1983–84 : Ass. Desp. Oeiras
1984–85 : Benfica
1985–86 : Benfica (2)
1986–87 : Benfica (3)
1987–88 : Benfica (4)
1988–89 : Benfica (5)
1989–90 : Colégio Gaia

1990–91 : Paço Arcos
1991–92 : Benfica (6)
1992–93 : Ac.Funchal 
1993–94 : Ac.Funchal (2)
1994–95 : Ac.Funchal (3)
1995–96 : Sports Madeira
1996–97 : Sports Madeira (2)
1997–98 : Colégio Gaia (2)
1998–99 : Madeira SAD
1999–00 : Madeira SAD (2)
2000–01 : Madeira SAD (3)
2001–02 : Madeira SAD (4)
2002–03 : Madeira SAD (5)
2003–04 : Madeira SAD (6)
2004–05 : Madeira SAD (7)

2005–06 : Madeira SAD (8)
2006–07 : Madeira SAD (9)
2007–08 : Madeira SAD (10)
2008–09 : Madeira SAD (11)
2009–10 : Madeira SAD (12)
2010–11 : Madeira SAD (13)
2011–12 : Madeira SAD (14)
2012–13 : Madeira SAD (15)
2013–14 : Madeira SAD (16)
2014–15 : Madeira SAD (17)
2015–16 : Sports Madeira (3)
2016–17 : Colégio Gaia (3)
2017–18 : Madeira SAD (18)
2018–19 : Colégio Gaia (4)
2019–20 : Cancelled

2020–21 : Madeira SAD (19)
2021–22 : Benfica (7)

Titles by club

References

Cup
1975 establishments in Portugal
Women's handball in Portugal
Women's sport in Portugal